Wolfgang Sühnholz (14 September 1946 – 27 December 2019) was a German-American soccer coach and former player. He won in the 1971–72 Bundesliga with Bayern Munich and in 1976 the North-American Soccer Bowl with Toronto Metros-Croatia. Later he settled in the United States and worked as a coach.

Playing career 
Initially he played for Hertha Zehlendorf with which he won the Regionalliga Berlin - part of the national second tier which was split up into five regional divisions - in 1969 and 1970.  After this he joined first division side Rot-Weiss Oberhausen where he immediately established himself in the standard formation.

After narrowly avoiding relegation he transferred together with Franz Krauthausen to the 1971 runners-up of the national championship FC Bayern Munich. Again, he immediately became part of their standard formation, playing alongside the stars of that era like Franz Beckenbauer and Gerd Müller. He played in 25 of the first 27 league matches of the side that went on to win in 1972 the third national championship in club history. In a cup match against 1. FC Köln in April 1972 he sustained a broken leg, which precluded him from almost two years.

Comeback attempts with Swiss first division side Grasshopper Club Zürich, where he played in March and April 1974 in six matches, albeit only one over 90 minutes, and Tennis Borussia Berlin, then a newcomer to the German first division, where he played in eight matches, thereof three over the full 90 minutes, between August and October of the same year, essentially failed. Notwithstanding, he scored a goal in his last match for the Berliners.

He came to the United States as a player and assistant coach in the NASL. He was named the 1976 Soccer Bowl MVP after capturing the title with Toronto Metros-Croatia. The following season (1977) he earned All-NASL First Team honors, joining legends who were on the same team that year, Pelé, Gordon Banks, George Best, and Franz Beckenbauer.

Managerial career 
Sühnholz was a national team coach for the U.S. Soccer Federation from 1996 to 2001; 1996–1999 as an assistant coach for the U-16 and U-20 Nationals Teams; head coach for the U.S. U-20 Men National Team from 1999 to 2001. While coaching for the U.S. Soccer he went to two World Cups and led his U-20 Teams to the World Cup in 2001 in Argentina. Since 2001 he was a head coach for the USYS ODP Region III, coaching the 86, 87, 88 and 89 boys' teams. A founder, along with Francisco Marcos, of the Austin Sockadillos, a team in the Southwest Indoor Soccer League, Sühnholz served as an assistant coach for the team from 1987 to 1989 when he replaced head coach Tony Simoes. He then coached the team until 1991. In 1994, he returned to the team, now known as the Austin Lone Stars of the USISL. In May 1997, he was named an assistant coach with the United States U-16 men's national soccer team. He returned to the Lone Stars in 1998.

Sühnholz held a USSF "A" License.

References

External links 
 
 Wolfgang Sühnholz at nasljerseys.com

1946 births
2019 deaths
American soccer coaches
Boston Minutemen players
Expatriate soccer players in Canada
Expatriate soccer players in the United States
FC Bayern Munich footballers
Bundesliga players
German footballers
German emigrants to the United States
Grasshopper Club Zürich players
Hertha Zehlendorf players
Las Vegas Quicksilver players
North American Soccer League (1968–1984) players
Rot-Weiß Oberhausen players
Tennis Borussia Berlin players
Toronto Blizzard (1971–1984) players
USISL coaches
Vancouver Whitecaps (1974–1984) players
West German expatriate footballers
West German expatriate sportspeople in Canada
West German expatriate sportspeople in the United States
West German footballers
Expatriate footballers in Switzerland 
West German expatriate sportspeople in Switzerland 
Footballers from Berlin
Association football forwards
United States men's national under-20 soccer team managers